My Brother's Keeper is a British comedy television series which originally aired on ITV in 1975 and 1976. George Layton and Jonathan Lynn wrote and starred in the programme about two twin brothers, one a policeman and the other anti-establishment student, with sharply contrasting worldviews.

Main cast
 George Layton as Brian Booth
 Jonathan Lynn as Pete Booth
 Tenniel Evans as Sergeant Bluett
 Hilary Mason as Mrs. Booth

References

Bibliography
 Walker, Craig. On The Buses: The Complete Story. Andrews UK Limited, 2011.

External links
 

1975 British television series debuts
1976 British television series endings
1970s British comedy television series
ITV sitcoms
English-language television shows
Television shows produced by Granada Television